The spiny giant frog or Norton's robber frog (Eleutherodactylus nortoni) is a species of frog in the family Eleutherodactylidae. It is named after James W. Norton who accompanied Albert Schwartz in his 1974 expedition to Hispaniola and collected the holotype.

Distribution
It is endemic to Hispaniola and known from the Massif de la Hotte, Massif de la Selle, and Sierra de Baoruco, occurring in both the Dominican Republic and Haiti.

Description
The five adult males in the type series measure  in snout–vent length. The colouration is green with darker green, irregular blotches. These blotches become nearly diagonal laterally. The fore- and hindlimbs have subcircular blotches; the thighs have three bars.

The male advertisement call is a series of about five rising glissando trills, ending in a semi-whistle.

Habitat and conservation
Males are calling from tall vegetation and rocks. Once considered locally not rare, Eleutherodactylus nortoni is now uncommon and assessed as "critically endangered". It is threatened by habitat loss caused by logging and agriculture. It is known from the Pic Macaya and La Visite National Parks in Haiti and from Sierra de Bahoruco National Park in the Dominican Republic, but habitat degradation is occurring in these areas too.

References

nortoni
Endemic fauna of Hispaniola
Amphibians of the Dominican Republic
Frogs of Haiti
Amphibians described in 1976
Taxa named by Albert Schwartz (zoologist)
Taxonomy articles created by Polbot